The Crowner John Mysteries are a series of novels by Bernard Knight following the fictional life of Sir John de Wolfe, a former Crusading knight appointed to the office of Keeper of the Pleas of the King's Crown (custos placitorum coronas), i.e. the King's Crowner or Coroner, for the county of Devon. 

Crowners were appointed in 1194, during the reign of Richard the Lionheart, in every county to check on the corruption of sheriffs, but also to raise as much money as possible towards the payment of the loans that covered the huge ransom after the king's capture in Austria on his return from the Third Crusade.

As Crowner, Sir John has to investigate all sudden deaths, murders, rapes, assaults, fires, wrecks and catches of royal fish, as well as trying to drive as much custom (through fines and taking of property owned by convicted criminals) as possible into the royal treasury, instead of the old manor and shire courts. We learn that Sir John has a large area to administer – there are supposed to be three crowners for Devon but he is the only one. In all this, he is assisted by Gwyn, his old Cornish retainer and Thomas de Peyne, an unfrocked priest, who is his clerk. John's surly social-climbing wife Matilda is the sister of the sheriff of Exeter, Sir Richard de Revelle, who does all he can to make life difficult for John, who seeks solace in the arms of his Welsh mistress Nesta, the landlady of the Bush Inn in the city.  

In Crowner Royal, set in 1196, John is appointed the first Coroner of the Verge by the king. He returns to Exeter in late 1196 in the next novel, A Plague of Heretics.

Apart from John, most of the main characters actually existed in history and every care is taken with research and the creation of atmosphere to offer an authentic picture of twelfth-century England. Most of the places described in the stories can be visited by readers today, even the gatehouse of Rougemont Castle in Exeter, where John had his office.

Novels in the Crowner John Series
 The Sanctuary Seeker (1998), set in November 1194
 The Poisoned Chalice (1998), set in December 1194
 Crowner's Quest (1999), set in Christmas 1194
 The Awful Secret (2000), set in March 1195
 The Tinner's Corpse (2001), set in April 1195
 The Grim Reaper (2002), set in May 1195
 Fear In The Forest (2003), set in June 1195
 The Witch Hunter (2004), set in August 1195
 Figure of Hate (2005), set in October 1195
 The Elixir of Death (2006), set in November 1195
 The Noble Outlaw (2007), set in December 1195
 The Manor of Death (2008), set in April 1196
 Crowner Royal (2009), set in Summer 1196
 A Plague of Heretics (2010), set in November 1196
 Crowner's Crusade (2012), actually a prequel to the series, taking place chronologically before The Sanctuary Seeker

Short stories featuring Crowner John
Crowner John appears in a series of books formed of linked stories written by Philip Gooden, Susanna Gregory, Michael Jecks, Bernard Knight and Ian Morson under the common pseudonym of the Medieval Murderers:

 The Tainted Relic (2005)
 Sword of Shame (2006)
 House of Shadows (2007) 
 The Lost Prophecies (2008)

References
 Contemporary Authors Online, Gale, 2009
 "Crowner Royal", Publishers Weekly, 24 August 2009.

External links
 Fantastic Fiction: Bernard Knight
  Professor Knight's Crowner John: Ann Lynn reviews the first six books, 31 May 2002

Historical novels by series
Mystery novels by series
Historical mystery novels
Novel series
Novels set in Exeter
Novels by Bernard Knight
British novels by series